Badminton competition at the 2002 Central American and Caribbean Games took place between 19–30 November in San Salvador, El Salvador.  It was the second appearance for badminton at the Games. There were 48 athletes from 9 different countries competed in five events.

Medal summary

Medal table

Men's events

Women's events

Mixed events

Results

Men's singles

Women's singles

Men's doubles

Women's doubles

Mixed doubles

Participants

References

External links 
 Badminton - page 159 - PDF

2002 Central American and Caribbean Games
Central American and Caribbean Games
2002